The 2007–08 Wessex Football League was the 22nd season of the Wessex Football League. The league champions for the first time in their history were A.F.C. Totton, who were promoted to the Southern League. The league consisted of two divisions, Division Two having been disbanded. There was some promotion and relegation between the two Wessex League divisions.

For sponsorship reasons, the league was known as the Sydenhams Wessex League.

League tables

Premier Division
The Premier Division consisted of 23 clubs, increased from 20 the previous season, after Gosport Borough were promoted to the Southern League. Four new clubs joined:
Alresford Town, runners-up in Division One.
Hayling United, champions of Division One.
New Milton Town, after resigning from the Southern League.
Romsey Town, third-placed in Division One.

Division One
Division One consisted of 21 clubs, increased from 19 the previous season, after Hayling United, Alresford Town and Romsey Town were promoted to the Premier Division, and Locks Heath left the league. Six clubs were promoted from Division Two after it was disbanded:
A.F.C. Aldermaston (13th in Division Two)
A.F.C. Portchester (4th)
Fleet Spurs (11th)
Tadley Calleva (2nd)
Totton & Eling, having changed their name from B.A.T. Sports (5th)
Whitchurch United (12th)

References

Wessex Football League seasons
9